The Right to Strike is a 1923 British silent drama film directed by Fred Paul and starring Lillian Hall-Davis, Fred Paul and Campbell Gullan. It was based on a play by Ernest Hutchinson.

Cast
 Lillian Hall-Davis as Mrs. Ormerod 
 Fred Paul as Dr. Wrigley 
 Campbell Gullan as Montague 
 Lauderdale Maitland as Ben Ormerod 
 Olaf Hytten

References

Bibliography
 Bamford, Kenton. Distorted Images: British National Identity and Film in the 1920s. I.B. Tauris, 1999.

External links

1923 films
British drama films
British silent feature films
Films directed by Fred Paul
British films based on plays
Films produced by G. B. Samuelson
British black-and-white films
1923 drama films
1920s English-language films
1920s British films
Silent drama films